Karandana South Grama Niladhari Division is a Grama Niladhari Division of the Eheliyagoda Divisional Secretariat of Ratnapura District, of Sabaragamuwa Province, Sri Lanka.

It remained a typical Sinhala Buddhist village until the 19th century. In addition to the original settlers, there has been some level of graphite mining during the British colonial period. Since the 19th century, many Sinhalese people have migrated from other areas for mining work, and the majority of the present villagers are descended from them. Also, with the spread of plantations from the late 19th century, a large number of Tamil Hindus also migrated.

An area with tea and rubber plantation as a primary economy. The village also consists of paddy fields and paddy farming is also done on a significant scale. Karandana Oya, a tributary of the Kalu Ganga, and the associated dola system are the main water sources of the village.

The main Buddhist religious center of the village is Karandana Sri Sanghikarama Maha Vihara. It was built by the village chiefs in 1870.

The name of Karandana village became more famous through the famous Dharma speaker Karandana Sri Jinarathana Thero (1875-1963) who served as the Adhipati Thero of the Timbirigasayaya Ashokarama Buddhist Temple.

The Karandana e Maha Vidyalaya was later named after Jinarathana Thero as a mark of respect by the villagers.

Karandana R/ Sri Jinarathana National School is the center of education in the village. This college, which started in 1888, is a school with a long history in Sabaragamuwa. It started as a boys' school during the British colonial era, which coincided with the revival movement of Buddhist education. The primary education headquarters is R/ Karadana Primary School . It also started in the year 1907 and has a history of more than a century.

Demographics

Ethnicity

Religion

References 

Western Province, Sri Lanka